Epyaxa is a genus of moths in the family Geometridae erected by Edward Meyrick in 1883.

Species
 Epyaxa agelasta (Turner, 1904)
 Epyaxa centroneura (Meyrick, 1891)
 Epyaxa epia (Turner, 1922)
 Epyaxa hyperythra (Lower, 1892)
 Epyaxa lucidata Walker, 1862
 Epyaxa pyrrhobaphes (Turner, 1926)
 Epyaxa rosearia Doubleday, 1843 – New Zealand looper, plantain moth
 Epyaxa sodaliata (Walker, 1862)
 Epyaxa subidaria (Guenée, 1857) – subidaria moth

References

Xanthorhoini